Hydropark is a station on the Kyiv Metro's Sviatoshynsko-Brovarska Line.

It opened on 5 November 1965 as part of the construction of the Brovarsky radius. The station is situated on the Venetsiansky Island right next to Hydropark. Unpopulated and not used for housing, it was transformed by the station into a summer resort for Kyivans when it fell in between the future line to Darnytsia and the new Brovary avenue that ran parallel to it.

Such planning is explained in the seasonal operation timetable which make the station rather distinctive. During the summer months, it receives quite a moderate passenger traffic, particularly on weekends and public holidays. During the winter months, there have been known instances when not a person would get on or off the station for whole weeks. There have even been attempts for the station to be skipped during peak hours.

In its appearance, the station is a typical example of the 1960s policy on Soviet public architecture. The station demonstrates its fully, minimise costs, simplicity (hence being surface level) and aesthetic appearance (architects I. Maslenkov and V. Bohdanovsky). A lone grey granite faced platform with a concrete hinged roof is supported by green ceramic tiled pillars. The only decoration that prevents the station from losing its face completely are small ceramic flower motifs on the top of the pillars. Entrances and exits come from two vestibules that are located under the platform and connected with large subways that run underneath the station and Brovary Avenue.

A unique feature of the station is that in addition, it has a second southern platform that would have allowed a quicker unload of passengers from the centrebound areas. However, its use has been discontinued in 1985 and in turn a second, western vestibule was built in 1990. However, during the winter months, it is closed and the space is used otherwise.

Gallery

References

External links
 Station description on official website of the Metro 
 Station description and photos 
 Satellite shot of centred on the station
 Photo Gallery 
 Yet another comprehensive Photo gallery 

Kyiv Metro stations
Railway stations opened in 1965
Transport on Venetsiansky Island
Venetsiansky Island
1965 establishments in Ukraine